This is a list of 1675 species in Megaselia, a genus of scuttle flies in the family Phoridae.

Megaselia species

A

 Megaselia abalienata Beyer, 1965 c g
 Megaselia abdita Schmitz, 1959 i c g
 Megaselia abdominalis Beyer, 1958 c g
 Megaselia abernethae Disney, 1988 c g
 Megaselia abludens Schmitz, 1927 c g
 Megaselia abstinens Borgmeier, 1967 c g
 Megaselia achatinae (Senior-White, 1924) c g
 Megaselia aciculata Borgmeier, 1964 i c g
 Megaselia aculeata (Schmitz, 1919) i c g
 Megaselia acuta Schmitz, 1935 c g
 Megaselia acutifurca Borgmeier, 1962 c g
 Megaselia acutipennis Bridarolli, 1951 c g
 Megaselia adempta Borgmeier, 1969 c g
 Megaselia advena Borgmeier, 1964 i c g
 Megaselia aemula (Brues, 1911) c g
 Megaselia aequalis (Wood, 1909) i c g
 Megaselia aequaliseta (Borgmeier, 1963) i c g
 Megaselia aequidistans Bridarolli, 1951 c g
 Megaselia aequilateralis Schmitz, 1936 c g
 Megaselia aequimarginata Bridarolli, 1951 c g
 Megaselia aequiperabilis Beyer, 1959 c g
 Megaselia aerivaga Schmitz, 1937 c g
 Megaselia aestiva Beyer, 1966 i c g
 Megaselia affinis (Wood, 1909) c g
 Megaselia afghana Schmitz, 1959 c g
 Megaselia africola Beyer, 1965 c g
 Megaselia agarici (Lintner, 1895) i c g
 Megaselia agnata Schmitz, 1926 c g
 Megaselia agnatoides Beyer, 1958 c g
 Megaselia alajuelensis (Malloch, 1914) c g
 Megaselia alata Brues, 1936 c g
 Megaselia albibasis Borgmeier, 1966 i c g
 Megaselia albicans (Wood, 1908) c g
 Megaselia albicaudata (Wood, 1910) c g
 Megaselia albiclava Schmitz, 1926 c g
 Megaselia albiclavata Borgmeier, 1967 c g
 Megaselia albocingulata (Strobl, 1906) c g
 Megaselia aldabrae Disney, 2007 c g
 Megaselia aldrichi Borgmeier, 1967 i c g
 Megaselia aletiae (Comstock, 1880) i c g
 Megaselia alisamorum Disney, 2008 c g
 Megaselia aliseta Borgmeier, 1967 c g
 Megaselia alius Disney, 2003 c g
 Megaselia allopyga Borgmeier, 1966 i c g
 Megaselia alloterga Borgmeier, 1967 c g
 Megaselia allothrix Borgmeier, 1964 i c g
 Megaselia alpina Schmitz & Beyer, 1965 c g
 Megaselia alsea Robinson, 1983 i c g
 Megaselia altezza Brenner, 2004 c g
 Megaselia alticolella (Wood, 1909) c g
 Megaselia altifrons (Wood, 1909) c g
 Megaselia amatorum Disney, 2003 c g
 Megaselia amica Borgmeier, 1962 c g
 Megaselia amplicornis Borgmeier, 1964 i c g
 Megaselia amplicosta Beyer, 1958 c g
 Megaselia amplifrons Borgmeier, 1962 c g
 Megaselia amplipennis Borgmeier, 1935 c g
 Megaselia ampullosa Borgmeier, 1961 c g
 Megaselia analis (Lundbeck, 1920) c g
 Megaselia andicola Brues, 1944 c g
 Megaselia andrenae Disney, Scanni, Scamoni & Andrietti, 1998 c g
 Megaselia andrewi Disney, 2003 c g
 Megaselia androidea Bridarolli, 1951 c g
 Megaselia aneura Malloch, 1935 c g
 Megaselia angelicae (Wood, 1910) c g
 Megaselia angularis (Schmitz, 1924) c g
 Megaselia angulata Gori, 2005 c g
 Megaselia angusta (Wood, 1909) c g
 Megaselia angustiata Schmitz, 1936 c g
 Megaselia angustifrons (Wood, 1912) c g
 Megaselia angustifurcata (Enderlein, 1912) c g
 Megaselia angustina Schmitz, 1936 c g
 Megaselia annulipes (Schmitz, 1921) i c g
 Megaselia anomala (Malloch, 1912) i c g
 Megaselia anomaliseta Beyer, 1958 c g
 Megaselia anomaloterga Disney, 1993 c g
 Megaselia antecellens Beyer, 1965 c g
 Megaselia antennalis Brues, 1936 c g
 Megaselia antennula Beyer, 1965 c g
 Megaselia anterodorsalis Borgmeier, 1962 c g
 Megaselia anterospinosa Borgmeier, 1962 c g
 Megaselia anthracina Borgmeier, 1962 c g
 Megaselia antialis Borgmeier, 1967 c g
 Megaselia anticheira Disney, 2004 c g
 Megaselia anticonigra Beyer, 1958 c g
 Megaselia apicalis (Brues, 1905) c g
 Megaselia apodicraea Borgmeier, 1971 c g
 Megaselia apoensis Brues, 1936 c g
 Megaselia apophysata Schmitz, 1940 c g
 Megaselia apozona Schmitz, 1936 c g
 Megaselia appendiculata Brues, 1936 c g
 Megaselia appetens Beyer, 1965 c g
 Megaselia apposita Brues, 1936 c g
 Megaselia approximata (Brunetti, 1912) c g
 Megaselia aquilonia Schmitz, 1958 c g
 Megaselia araneivora Goto, 1985 c g
 Megaselia arbuciensis Garcia-Romera g
 Megaselia arcticae Disney, 2004 c g
 Megaselia arctifurca Borgmeier, 1967 c g
 Megaselia arcuata (Malloch, 1912) i c g
 Megaselia arcuatilinea Beyer, 1959 c g
 Megaselia ardua Schmitz, 1940 c g
 Megaselia argentea Borgmeier, 1962 c g
 Megaselia argiopephaga Disney, 1982 c g
 Megaselia arietina Disney, 1991 c g
 Megaselia aristalis (Malloch, 1914) i c g
 Megaselia aristata Brues, 1936 c g
 Megaselia aristica (Schmitz, 1920)
 Megaselia aristolochiae Hime & Costa, 1985 c g
 Megaselia arizonensis (Malloch, 1912) i c g
 Megaselia armata (Wood, 1909) c g
 Megaselia armipectus Borgmeier, 1967 c g
 Megaselia armstrongorum  g
 Megaselia arquata Schmitz, 1935 c g
 Megaselia artangula Beyer, 1965 c g
 Megaselia ashmolei Disney, 1990 c g
 Megaselia asthenichaeta Brues, 1944 c g
 Megaselia asymmetrica Beyer, 1959 c g
 Megaselia aterrima (Strobl, 1906) c g
 Megaselia athesis Brenner, 2006 c g
 Megaselia atomella (Malloch, 1912) i c g
 Megaselia atratula Borgmeier, 1964 i c g
 Megaselia atriclava (Brues, 1911) c g
 Megaselia atricolor Borgmeier, 1962 c g
 Megaselia atricornis Beyer, 1958 c g
 Megaselia atridorsata Malloch, 1935 c g
 Megaselia atristola Borgmeier, 1962 c g
 Megaselia atrita (Brues, 1915) c g
 Megaselia atrosericea Schmitz, 1927 c g
 Megaselia atrox Borgmeier, 1968 i c g
 Megaselia attenuata Bridarolli, 1951 c g
 Megaselia audreyae Disney, 1978 c g
 Megaselia aurantiaca Borgmeier, 1971 c g
 Megaselia aurea (Aldrich, 1896) i c g b
 Megaselia auriclava Beyer, 1958 c g
 Megaselia auricoma Schmitz, 1927 c g
 Megaselia austera Schmitz, 1929 c g
 Megaselia australiae Beyer, 1960 c g

B

 Megaselia badia Schmitz, 1938 c g
 Megaselia baezi Disney, 1990 c g
 Megaselia baltica (Schmitz, 1924) c g
 Megaselia bambootelmatae Disney, 1995 c g
 Megaselia barbata Brues, 1936 c g
 Megaselia barberi (Malloch, 1912) i c g
 Megaselia barbertonia Schmitz, 1929 c g
 Megaselia barbicauda Borgmeier, 1967 c g
 Megaselia barbimargo Beyer, 1960 c g
 Megaselia barbitergata Beyer, 1965 c g
 Megaselia barbulata (Wood, 1909) c g
 Megaselia baroringensis Brues, 1936 c g
 Megaselia barrientosi Garcia-Romera g
 Megaselia barroensis Disney, 2007 c g
 Megaselia basicavata Borgmeier, 1964 i c g
 Megaselia basichaeta Borgmeier, 1969 c g
 Megaselia basicrinalis Schmitz, 1953 c g
 Megaselia basipecten Beyer, 1965 c g
 Megaselia basiseta Malloch, 1935 c g
 Megaselia basispinata Lundbeck, 1920 i c g
 Megaselia basitarsalis Beyer, 1964 i c g
 Megaselia basitumida Schmitz, 1927 c g
 Megaselia basiturgida Disney & Durska, 2011
 Megaselia basiveluta Schmitz, 1935 c g
 Megaselia basseti Disney, 2011
 Megaselia beatricis Colyer, 1962 c g
 Megaselia beckeri (Wood, 1909) i c g
 Megaselia bella (Brues, 1905) c g
 Megaselia belumensis Disney, 1995 c g
 Megaselia benebarbata Beyer, 1965 c g
 Megaselia beringensis Borgmeier, 1964 i c g
 Megaselia berndeseni (Schmitz, 1919) c g
 Megaselia berndseni (Schmitz, 1919) g
 Megaselia beyeri Schmitz, 1965 c g
 Megaselia bezziana (Enderlein, 1912) c g
 Megaselia biarticulata Disney, 1988 c g
 Megaselia bicolor (Meigen, 1830) c g
 Megaselia bifida Disney, 1983 c g
 Megaselia bifurcata Disney, 1983 c g
 Megaselia bihamulata Brues, 1936 c g
 Megaselia bilobulus Disney, 2003 c g
 Megaselia bimaculata Borgmeier, 1966 i c g
 Megaselia bingana Disney, 1991 c g
 Megaselia bipunctata Borgmeier, 1963 c g
 Megaselia birdensis Disney, 2006 c g
 Megaselia bisecta Brues, 1936 c g
 Megaselia biseta Beyer, 1960 c g
 Megaselia bisetalis Fang & Liu, 2005 c g
 Megaselia bisetigera Beyer, 1965 c g
 Megaselia bisetulata (Malloch, 1915) i c g
 Megaselia bisinuata Borgmeier, 1962 c g
 Megaselia bispatulata Bridarolli, 1951 c g
 Megaselia bisticta  g
 Megaselia bistruncata Schmitz, 1936 c g
 Megaselia bivesicata Schmitz, 1931 c g
 Megaselia boesii Disney, 2006 c g
 Megaselia boliviana (Enderlein, 1912) c g
 Megaselia boninensis Beyer, 1967 c g
 Megaselia borgmeieri Beyer, 1965 c g
 Megaselia bovista (Gimmerthal, 1848) i
 Megaselia bowlesi Disney, 1981 c g
 Megaselia brachyprocta Borgmeier, 1964 i c g
 Megaselia bradyi  g
 Megaselia brejchaorum  g
 Megaselia brevibarba Borgmeier, 1964 i c g
 Megaselia brevicauda Borgmeier, 1964 i c g
 Megaselia breviceps Borgmeier, 1967 c g
 Megaselia breviciliata (Strobl, 1899) c g
 Megaselia brevicornis Schmitz, 1938 g
 Megaselia brevicostalis (Wood, 1910) i c g
 Megaselia brevifemorata Schmitz, 1926 c g
 Megaselia brevifrons Borgmeier, 1962 c g
 Megaselia brevineura Brues, 1936 c g
 Megaselia brevior (Schmitz, 1924) c g
 Megaselia brevipes (Lundbeck, 1920) c g
 Megaselia brevis (Collin, 1912) c g
 Megaselia breviscula (Brues, 1924) g
 Megaselia brevisecta Brues, 1936 c g
 Megaselia breviseta (Wood, 1912) c g
 Megaselia brevissima (Schmitz, 1924) c g
 Megaselia breviterga (Lundback, 1921) i c g
 Megaselia breviuscula (Brues, 1924) c g
 Megaselia brevivallorum Disney, 2003 c g
 Megaselia brianbrowni Disney, 1994 c g
 Megaselia bridarollii Colyer, 1952 c g
 Megaselia brokawi Disney, 1994 c g
 Megaselia bruchiana (Borgmeier & Schmitz, 1923) c g
 Megaselia bruesi Disney, 1986 c g
 Megaselia brunnea (Schmitz, 1920) c g
 Megaselia brunneicornis (Schmitz, 1920) c g
 Megaselia brunneipalpata Beyer, 1964 i c g
 Megaselia brunneipennis Costa, 1857 c g
 Megaselia brunneoflava Beyer, 1958 c g
 Megaselia brunnicans (Brues, 1924) c g
 Megaselia brunnipennis (Santos Abreu, 1921) c g
 Megaselia brunnipes (Malloch, 1912) i c g
 Megaselia buccata Borgmeier, 1969 c g
 Megaselia buchsi Disney, 1999 c g
 Megaselia bulbicornis Borgmeier, 1962 c g
 Megaselia bulbosa Brues, 1936 c g
 Megaselia burmensis Beyer, 1958 c g
 Megaselia bursaria Borgmeier, 1971 c g
 Megaselia bursata Borgmeier, 1966 i g
 Megaselia bursella Borgmeier, 1969 c g
 Megaselia burselloides Borgmeier, 1969 c g
 Megaselia bursifera Borgmeier, 1971 c g
 Megaselia buxtoni Colyer, 1954 c g

C

 Megaselia cakpoae Disney in Disney, Kurina, Tedersoo & Cakpo, 2013
 Megaselia caledoniae Borgmeier, 1967 c g
 Megaselia californiensis (Malloch, 1912) i c g
 Megaselia callunae Garcia-Romera g
 Megaselia calvescens Borgmeier, 1962 c g
 Megaselia camariana (Coquerel, 1848) c g
 Megaselia camilla Borgmeier, 1964 i g
 Megaselia campestris (Wood, 1908) c g
 Megaselia canaliculata (Brues, 1915) c g
 Megaselia canariensis (Santos Abreu, 1921) c g
 Megaselia canaryae Disney, 1990 c g
 Megaselia capensis Beyer, 1959 c g
 Megaselia capillicauda Borgmeier, 1964 i c g
 Megaselia capillipes Schmitz, 1929 c g
 Megaselia capronata Schmitz, 1940 c g
 Megaselia capta Borgmeier, 1964 i c g
 Megaselia carinata Borgmeier, 1967 c g
 Megaselia carlynensis (Malloch, 1912) i c g
 Megaselia carminis Garcia-Romera g
 Megaselia carola Robinson, 1981 i c g
 Megaselia carthayensis  g
 Megaselia cassandra Borgmeier, 1971 c g
 Megaselia castanea Bridarolli, 1937 c g
 Megaselia castaneipleura Borgmeier, 1969 c g
 Megaselia caudalis Beyer, 1959 c g
 Megaselia caudifera Beyer, 1965 c g
 Megaselia cavernicola (Brues, 1906)
 Megaselia cavifemur Borgmeier, 1964 i c g
 Megaselia cavifrons Schmitz, 1929 c g
 Megaselia cavimargo Borgmeier, 1962 c g
 Megaselia cercaria Borgmeier, 1969 c g
 Megaselia cercisetaria Disney, 2003 c g
 Megaselia chaetocera Borgmeier, 1964 i c g
 Megaselia chaetogaster Borgmeier, 1971 c g
 Megaselia chaetoneura (Malloch, 1912) i c g
 Megaselia chaetopyga (Lundbeck, 1921) c g
 Megaselia chaetorhoea Beyer, 1966 c g
 Megaselia chainensis Disney, 1985 i c g
 Megaselia chapmani Borgmeier, 1967 c g
 Megaselia chilochaeta Borgmeier, 1962 c g
 Megaselia chiloensis Schmitz, 1929 c g
 Megaselia chinganica Naumov, 1992 c g
 Megaselia chinyeroensis Disney, 2010
 Megaselia chipensis (Brues, 1911) c g
 Megaselia chlorocera Borgmeier, 1968 c g
 Megaselia chlumetiae Disney, 1992 c g
 Megaselia chorogi Naumov, 1979 c g
 Megaselia chrysophora Beyer, 1967 c g
 Megaselia chrysopyge Beyer, 1965 c g
 Megaselia ciancii  g
 Megaselia ciliata (Zetterstedt, 1848) c g
 Megaselia ciliatula Schmitz, 1957 c g
 Megaselia cilipes (Brues, 1907) c g
 Megaselia cilla Borgmeier, 1962 c g
 Megaselia cinerascens Borgmeier, 1962 c g
 Megaselia cinerea Schmitz, 1938 c g
 Megaselia cinereifrons (Strobl, 1910) c g
 Megaselia cirratula Schmitz, 1948 c g
 Megaselia cirricauda Colyer, 1962 c g
 Megaselia cirripes Borgmeier, 1964 i c g
 Megaselia cirripyga Borgmeier, 1964 i c g
 Megaselia cirriventris Schmitz, 1929 i c g
 Megaselia citrinella Buck & Disney, 2001 c g
 Megaselia claggi Brues, 1936 c g
 Megaselia clara (Schmitz, 1921) i c g
 Megaselia claricornis Colyer, 1962 c g
 Megaselia claripennis Bridarolli, 1951 c g
 Megaselia claudia Borgmeier, 1967 c g
 Megaselia clavipedella Brues, 1936 c g
 Megaselia clementsi Disney, 1978 c g
 Megaselia clemonsi Disney, 1984 c g
 Megaselia coacta (Lundbeck, 1920) c g
 Megaselia coaetanea Schmitz, 1929 c g
 Megaselia coalescens Borgmeier, 1962 c g
 Megaselia coarctipennis Borgmeier, 1962 c g
 Megaselia coccyx Schmitz, 1965 i c g
 Megaselia cochlophila Borgmeier, 1967 c g
 Megaselia coei Schmitz, 1938 c g
 Megaselia cognoscibilis Beyer, 1958 c g
 Megaselia collini (Wood, 1909) c g
 Megaselia colyeri (Beyer, 1966) c g
 Megaselia comfurcula Beyer, 1965 c g
 Megaselia communiformis (Schmitz, 1918) c g
 Megaselia communis Borgmeier, 1962 c g
 Megaselia comorosensis Disney, 2005 c g
 Megaselia comosa (Santos Abreu, 1921) c g
 Megaselia compacta Schmitz, 1940 c g
 Megaselia compacticeps Borgmeier, 1964 c g
 Megaselia compactipes Borgmeier, 1964 i g
 Megaselia compar Beyer, 1958 c g
 Megaselia comparabilis Bridarolli, 1951 c g
 Megaselia compressa Borgmeier, 1966 i c g
 Megaselia concava (Borgmeier, 1925) c g
 Megaselia confirmata Borgmeier, 1962 c g
 Megaselia conflugens Borgmeier, 1964 c g
 Megaselia conformipar Schmitz, 1958 c g
 Megaselia conformis (Wood, 1909) c g
 Megaselia confortata Schmitz, 1929 c g
 Megaselia conglomerata (Malloch, 1912) i c g
 Megaselia congrex Beyer, 1965 c g
 Megaselia congrua Schmitz, 1926 c g
 Megaselia conifera Borgmeier, 1967 c g
 Megaselia connexa Borgmeier, 1962 c g
 Megaselia consetigera (Schmitz, 1925) c g
 Megaselia consimilis (Lundbeck, 1920) c g
 Megaselia consobrina Beyer, 1958 c g
 Megaselia conspicua Brues, 1936 c g
 Megaselia conspicualis (Malloch, 1912) i c g
 Megaselia constricta Colyer, 1962 c g
 Megaselia constrictior Schmitz, 1929 c g
 Megaselia consueta (Collin, 1912) c g
 Megaselia continuata Bridarolli, 1951 c g
 Megaselia copalina (Meunier, 1905) c g
 Megaselia copiosa Borgmeier, 1967 c g
 Megaselia cordobensis (Malloch, 1912) c g
 Megaselia corkerae Disney, 1981 c g
 Megaselia cornipalpis  g
 Megaselia correlata (Schmitz, 1918) g
 Megaselia costalis (Roser, 1840) c g
 Megaselia costella Beyer, 1965 i c g
 Megaselia costipennis Brues, 1936 c g
 Megaselia cothurnata (Schmitz, 1919) c g
 Megaselia coulsoni Disney, 1987 c g
 Megaselia crassicosta (Strobl, 1892) c g
 Megaselia crassicostata Beyer, 1965 c g
 Megaselia crassilla Schmitz, 1926 c g
 Megaselia crassimana (Brues, 1905) c g
 Megaselia crassipes (Wood, 1909) i c g
 Megaselia crassirostris Borgmeier, 1962 c g
 Megaselia crassitarsalis Borgmeier, 1931 c g
 Megaselia crassivenia Schmitz, 1927 c g
 Megaselia creasoni  g
 Megaselia crellini Disney, 2011
 Megaselia crepidata Borgmeier, 1964 i c g
 Megaselia cribella Borgmeier, 1964 i c g
 Megaselia crinellicosta (Enderlein, 1912) c g
 Megaselia crinellifemur Borgmeier, 1969 c g
 Megaselia crinifrons Borgmeier, 1966 i c g
 Megaselia criniloba Beyer, 1966 c g
 Megaselia crinipyga Borgmeier, 1969 c g
 Megaselia crinita Schmitz, 1939 c g
 Megaselia criniticauda Colyer, 1962 c g
 Megaselia criniventris Borgmeier, 1958 c g
 Megaselia cristicincta Beyer, 1965 c g
 Megaselia crocea Borgmeier, 1967 c g
 Megaselia croceifascia Borgmeier, 1962 c g
 Megaselia croceiventris Borgmeier, 1971 c g
 Megaselia crocicornis Borgmeier, 1962 c g
 Megaselia croeciclava Borgmeier, 1964 i c g
 Megaselia crosskeyi Beyer, 1965 c g
 Megaselia ctenophora Beyer, 1965 c g
 Megaselia cuneata Borgmeier, 1962 i c g
 Megaselia curtibarba Beyer, 1964 i c g
 Megaselia curticauda Borgmeier, 1967 c g
 Megaselia curticiliata Borgmeier, 1967 c g
 Megaselia curticosta Borgmeier, 1966 i c g
 Megaselia curtifrons (Brues, 1915) c g
 Megaselia curtineura (Brues, 1909) c g
 Megaselia curtinoides Disney, 1991 c g
 Megaselia curtispinosa Disney, 1991 c g
 Megaselia curtissima Beyer, 1967 c g
 Megaselia curva (Brues, 1911) c g
 Megaselia curvata Bridarolli, 1951 c g
 Megaselia curvicapilla Schmitz, 1947 c g
 Megaselia curvitibia Beyer, 1965 c g
 Megaselia curvivenia Schmitz, 1928 c g
 Megaselia cybele Borgmeier, 1962 c g

D

 Megaselia daemon Bridarolli, 1951 c g
 Megaselia dahli (Becker, 1901) c g
 Megaselia damasi Disney, 1985 c g
 Megaselia daphne Borgmeier, 1962 c g
 Megaselia darlingtonae Disney, 1995 c g
 Megaselia dawahi Disney, 2006 c g
 Megaselia debilis (Brues, 1905) c g
 Megaselia debilitata Brues, 1936 c g
 Megaselia deceptrix Beyer, 1966 c g
 Megaselia decipiens (Meijere, 1910) c g
 Megaselia decora Robinson, 1978 i c g
 Megaselia decussata Borgmeier, 1966 i c g
 Megaselia defecta Borgmeier, 1969 c g
 Megaselia defibaughorum  g
 Megaselia deficiens Borgmeier, 1962 c g
 Megaselia definita Borgmeier, 1969 c g
 Megaselia deflexilinea Beyer, 1958 c g
 Megaselia delicatula (Brues, 1905) c g
 Megaselia deltofemoralis Disney, 2011 g
 Megaselia deltoides Borgmeier, 1964 i c g
 Megaselia deltomera (Schmitz, 1924) c g
 Megaselia deltomima Borgmeier, 1964 i c g
 Megaselia deningi Disney, 1981 c g
 Megaselia dennerti Disney & Beyer, 2005 c g
 Megaselia densa Bridarolli, 1951 c g
 Megaselia densior Schmitz, 1927 c g
 Megaselia dentata Disney, 1991 c g
 Megaselia depililobulus Disney & Durska, 2011
 Megaselia deprivata Borgmeier, 1969 c g
 Megaselia destituta Beyer, 1965 c g
 Megaselia destructor (Malloch, 1915) c g
 Megaselia deuteromegas Borgmeier, 1969 c g
 Megaselia devia Schmitz, 1936 c g
 Megaselia dewittei Beyer, 1965 c g
 Megaselia dewittensis Disney, 2003 c g
 Megaselia dewulfi Bridarolli, 1951 c g
 Megaselia diana Borgmeier, 1951 c g
 Megaselia dichroma Beyer, 1958 c g
 Megaselia dickoni Wakeford, 1994 c g
 Megaselia differens Schmitz, 1948 c g
 Megaselia difficilis (Malloch, 1912) i c g
 Megaselia digitalis Schmitz, 1957 c g
 Megaselia digiturgida Disney, 2008 c g
 Megaselia digressa Brues, 1936 c g
 Megaselia dilatata (Brues, 1919) i c g
 Megaselia dilatimana Disney, 2006 c g
 Megaselia dimidata Brues, 1936 c g
 Megaselia dimidia Schmitz, 1926 c g
 Megaselia diminuta Borgmeier, 1962 c g
 Megaselia dimorphica Disney, 1997 c g
 Megaselia dinacantha Borgmeier, 1967 c g
 Megaselia dinda Borgmeier, 1962 c g
 Megaselia diplochaeta Borgmeier, 1969 c g
 Megaselia diplothrix Borgmeier, 1964 i c g
 Megaselia dipsacosa Smith, 1977 g
 Megaselia directa Brues, 1936 c g
 Megaselia discolor Beyer, 1958 c g
 Megaselia discrepans Borgmeier, 1971 c g
 Megaselia discreta (Wood, 1909) c g
 Megaselia disiuncta Borgmeier, 1958 c g
 Megaselia disneyella Brenner, 2006 c g
 Megaselia disparifemur Borgmeier, 1962 c g
 Megaselia disparipennis Borgmeier, 1962 c g
 Megaselia dispariseta Borgmeier, 1962 c g
 Megaselia dispariterga Borgmeier, 1971 c g
 Megaselia dissita Borgmeier, 1967 c g
 Megaselia divergens (Malloch, 1912) i c g
 Megaselia diversa (Wood, 1909) c g
 Megaselia dolichoptera Bridarolli, 1937 c g
 Megaselia donahuei  g
 Megaselia doryphora Schmitz, 1957 c g
 Megaselia drakei Disney, 1984 c g
 Megaselia dreisbachi Borgmeier, 1964 i c g
 Megaselia dubitalis (Wood, 1908) c g
 Megaselia dubitata (Malloch, 1912) i c g
 Megaselia dupliciseta Bridarolli, 1937 c g
 Megaselia durskae Disney, 1989 c g

E

 Megaselia ebejeri Disney, 2006 c g
 Megaselia eccoptomera Schmitz, 1927 i c g
 Megaselia ectopia Borgmeier, 1964 i c g
 Megaselia edenensis Disney, 2008 c g
 Megaselia egena (Collin, 1912) c g
 Megaselia eisfelderae Schmitz, 1948 i c g
 Megaselia elegantula Borgmeier, 1969 c g
 Megaselia eleuthera Borgmeier, 1964 i c g
 Megaselia elongata (Wood, 1914) c g
 Megaselia emarginata (Wood, 1908) c g
 Megaselia eminens Schmitz, 1953 c g
 Megaselia enderleini (Brues, 1912) c g
 Megaselia epanquadrata Disney, 2004 c g
 Megaselia equisecta Brues, 1936 c g
 Megaselia erecta (Wood, 1910) i c g
 Megaselia errata (Wood, 1912) c g
 Megaselia ethiopia (Meunier, 1905) c g
 Megaselia eupygis Schmitz, 1929 c g
 Megaselia euryprocta Schmitz, 1957 c g
 Megaselia evaginata Beyer, 1965 c g
 Megaselia evoluta Bridarolli, 1951 c g
 Megaselia exaltata (Malloch, 1914) c g
 Megaselia exangulata Schmitz, 1947 c g
 Megaselia exarcuata Schmitz, 1927 c g
 Megaselia excavata Schmitz, 1927 c g
 Megaselia excisa Beyer, 1966 c g
 Megaselia excisoides Beyer, 1966 c g
 Megaselia excorticata Disney, 2009
 Megaselia exiens Borgmeier, 1971 c g
 Megaselia exquisita Borgmeier, 1962 c g
 Megaselia exsecta Schmitz, 1957 c g
 Megaselia exsertacosta Disney, 1995 c g
 Megaselia extans (Collin, 1912) c g
 Megaselia extensicosta Borgmeier, 1967 c g
 Megaselia extensifrons Brues, 1936 c g
 Megaselia exuberans Borgmeier, 1967 c g

F

 Megaselia falciphalli Disney, 2003 c g
 Megaselia falklandensis Disney, 1989 c g
 Megaselia fallobreviseta Disney, 2011
 Megaselia falloconsueta Disney, 2006 c g
 Megaselia falsoluta Disney, 2006 c g
 Megaselia fasciiventris (Enderlein, 1912) c g
 Megaselia fasciventris (Becker, 1914) c g
 Megaselia fastigiicola Beyer, 1959 c g
 Megaselia fausta Borgmeier, 1969 c g
 Megaselia femoralis (Enderlein, 1912) i c g
 Megaselia fenestralis (Schmitz, 1919)
 Megaselia fenestrata (Malloch, 1912) i c g
 Megaselia fennicola (Beyer, 1958)
 Megaselia ferimpariseta Disney, 2003 c g
 Megaselia feronia Schmitz, 1934 c g
 Megaselia ferruginosa (Brues, 1912) c g
 Megaselia feshiensis Disney, 1987 c g
 Megaselia ficaria Disney, 1991 c g
 Megaselia filamentosa Schmitz, 1958 c g
 Megaselia filiciarboris Disney, 2003 c g
 Megaselia fimbriata Borgmeier, 1962 c g
 Megaselia finitima Beyer, 1965 c g
 Megaselia fisheri (Malloch, 1912) i c g
 Megaselia flammula Schmitz, 1928 c g
 Megaselia flava (Fallen, 1823) i c g
 Megaselia flavescens (Wood, 1909) c g
 Megaselia flavibasis Beyer, 1958 c g
 Megaselia flavicans Schmitz, 1935 c g
 Megaselia flavicoxa (Zetterstedt, 1848) c g
 Megaselia flavidula Beyer, 1958 c g
 Megaselia flavifacies (Brunetti, 1912) c g
 Megaselia flavifacioides (Senior-White, 1922) c g
 Megaselia flavifrons Beyer, 1958 c g
 Megaselia flavipes Borgmeier, 1962 c g
 Megaselia flaviscutellata Beyer, 1960 c g
 Megaselia flavistola Borgmeier, 1967 c g
 Megaselia flaviventris (Santos Abreu, 1921) c g
 Megaselia flavohalterata (Enderlein, 1912) c g
 Megaselia flavopleura (Malloch, 1914) c g
 Megaselia flexivena Borgmeier, 1971 c g
 Megaselia floccicauda Disney, 2006 c g
 Megaselia floricola Borgmeier, 1967 c g
 Megaselia foederalis Borgmeier, 1962 c g
 Megaselia fomitopsis Naumov, 1992 c g
 Megaselia formosana (Brues, 1924) c g
 Megaselia forntinervis Schmitz, 1926 g
 Megaselia forticosta Beyer, 1958 c g
 Megaselia fortinervis Schmitz, 1926 c g
 Megaselia fortipes Borgmeier, 1967 c g
 Megaselia fortirostris Borgmeier, 1969 c g
 Megaselia fortiuscula (Brues, 1915) c g
 Megaselia frameata Schmitz, 1927 c g
 Megaselia francoae  g
 Megaselia franconiensis (Malloch, 1912) i c g
 Megaselia fratercula (Santos Abreu, 1921) c g
 Megaselia fraudulatrix Beyer, 1958 c g
 Megaselia frontalis (Wood, 1909) c g
 Megaselia frontata (Collin, 1912) c g
 Megaselia frontella Beyer, 1966 c g
 Megaselia fujiokai  g
 Megaselia fulminifacies Beyer, 1965 c g
 Megaselia fulvicauda Brues, 1936 c g
 Megaselia fulviobscura (Santos Abreu, 1921) c g
 Megaselia fulvipalpis (Santos Abreu, 1921) c g
 Megaselia fumata (Malloch, 1909) c g
 Megaselia fumipennis (Brues, 1907) c g
 Megaselia funeralis Schmitz, 1928 c g
 Megaselia funesta Schmitz, 1935
 Megaselia fungicola (Coquillett, 1895) i c g
 Megaselia fungivora (Wood, 1909) i c g
 Megaselia furcatilis Beyer, 1964 i c g
 Megaselia furcatipennis Schmitz, 1934 c g
 Megaselia furcella (Enderlein, 1912) c g
 Megaselia furcellans Beyer, 1966 c g
 Megaselia furcilla Schmitz, 1957 g
 Megaselia furcipriva Borgmeier, 1963 c g
 Megaselia furculae Disney, 2006 c g
 Megaselia furtiva (Aldrich, 1896) c g
 Megaselia furukawae Disney, 1989 c g
 Megaselia furva Schmitz, 1929 c g
 Megaselia furvicolor Beyer, 1959 c g
 Megaselia fusca (Wood, 1909) c g
 Megaselia fuscamplicosta Disney, 2006 c g
 Megaselia fusciclava Schmitz, 1935 c g
 Megaselia fuscilobulorum Disney in Disney, Kurina, Tedersoo & Cakpo, 2013
 Megaselia fuscinervis (Wood, 1908) c g
 Megaselia fuscinula (Schmitz, 1926) c g
 Megaselia fuscipalpis (Lundbeck, 1920) c g
 Megaselia fuscipleura Borgmeier, 1962 c g
 Megaselia fuscivertex (Enderlein, 1912) c g
 Megaselia fuscoides Schmitz, 1934 c g
 Megaselia fuscomaculata Borgmeier, 1958 c g
 Megaselia fuscopleuralis Schmitz, 1929 c g
 Megaselia fuscovariana Schmitz, 1933 c g
 Megaselia fuscula Borgmeier, 1962 c g
 Megaselia fusipalpis Borgmeier, 1966 i c g

G

 Megaselia gallagheri Disney, 2006 c g
 Megaselia galogensis Brues, 1936 c g
 Megaselia gargarans Schmitz, 1948 c g
 Megaselia gartensis Disney, 1985 i c g
 Megaselia gemella Borgmeier, 1962 c g
 Megaselia gemellima Beyer, 1965 c g
 Megaselia genuina (Strobl, 1894) c g
 Megaselia georgiae Borgmeier, 1964 i c g
 Megaselia gerlachi Disney, 2005 c g
 Megaselia gigantea Brenner, 2004 c g
 Megaselia gilvivitta Beyer, 1965 c g
 Megaselia giraudii (Egger, 1862) i
 Megaselia glabrifrons (Wood, 1909) i c g
 Megaselia glabrimargo Buck & Disney, 2001 c g
 Megaselia glandularis Borgmeier, 1958 c g
 Megaselia globicornis Schmitz, 1948 c g
 Megaselia globipyga Borgmeier, 1966 i c g b
 Megaselia globulosa Beyer, 1965 c g
 Megaselia gloriosa Borgmeier, 1958 c g
 Megaselia goidanichi Schmitz, 1927 c g
 Megaselia gombakensis Disney, 1993 c g
 Megaselia goniata Borgmeier, 1964 i c g
 Megaselia gotoi Disney, 1989 c g
 Megaselia gouteuxi Disney, 2004 c g
 Megaselia gracilipalpis Borgmeier, 1969 c g
 Megaselia gracilipes Borgmeier, 1964 i c g
 Megaselia gradualis Borgmeier, 1971 c g
 Megaselia grandantennata Beyer, 1966 c g
 Megaselia grandicosta Borgmeier, 1958 c g
 Megaselia grandifurca Borgmeier, 1958 c g
 Megaselia grandipennis Borgmeier, 1967 c g
 Megaselia grandlabella Disney, 2003 c g
 Megaselia gratiosa Schmitz, 1939 c g
 Megaselia gravis Borgmeier, 1964 i c g
 Megaselia gregaria (Wood, 1910) c g
 Megaselia gressitti Beyer, 1967 c g
 Megaselia grisaria Schmitz, 1933 c g
 Megaselia griseifrons (Lundbeck, 1920) c g
 Megaselia griseipennis (Santos Abreu, 1921) c g
 Megaselia groenlandica (Lundbeck, 1901) i c g
 Megaselia guentermuelleri Mostovski, 2015

H

 Megaselia halterata (Wood, 1910) i c g
 Megaselia hamaticauda Borgmeier, 1969 c g
 Megaselia hanseni Disney, 2006 c g
 Megaselia hapalogaster Borgmeier, 1971 c g
 Megaselia haraldlundi Disney, 1995 c g
 Megaselia haranti Delage & Lauraire, 1970 g
 Megaselia hardingorum  g
 Megaselia harteni Disney, 1991 c g
 Megaselia hartfordensis Disney, 1983 c g
 Megaselia hauclaudia Disney, 2003 c g
 Megaselia hayleyensis Disney, 1987 c g
 Megaselia hebblewhitei Disney, 2003 c g
 Megaselia hebetifrons Beyer, 1959 c g
 Megaselia hectochaeta Schmitz & Beyer, 1965 c g
 Megaselia heini  g
 Megaselia hemicyclia Beyer, 1965 c g
 Megaselia hendersoni Disney, 1979 c g
 Megaselia henrydisneyi Durska, 1998 c g
 Megaselia hentschkeae  g
 Megaselia hepworthae Disney, 1981 c g
 Megaselia hesperia Borgmeier, 1966 i c g
 Megaselia heterochaeta Beyer, 1966 c g
 Megaselia heterodactyla Beyer, 1964 i c g
 Megaselia hexacantha Borgmeier, 1971 c g
 Megaselia hexachaeta Borgmeier, 1962 c g
 Megaselia hexamegas Borgmeier, 1962 c g
 Megaselia hexanophila Buck & Disney, 2001 c g
 Megaselia hibernans Schmitz, 1934 c g
 Megaselia hibernica Schmitz, 1938 c g
 Megaselia hilaris Schmitz, 1927 c g
 Megaselia hirsuta (Wood, 1910) c g
 Megaselia hirticaudata (Wood, 1910) c g
 Megaselia hirticrus (Schmitz, 1918) c g
 Megaselia hirtitarsalis Beyer, 1966 c g
 Megaselia hirtiventris (Wood, 1909) c g
 Megaselia hispida Borgmeier, 1966 i c g
 Megaselia hoffmanorum  g
 Megaselia hoggorum  g
 Megaselia hoguei  g
 Megaselia holosericei Disney & Brown, 2003 c g
 Megaselia horsfieldi Disney, 1986 c g
 Megaselia hortensis (Wood, 1909) c g
 Megaselia horticola Borgmeier, 1962 c g
 Megaselia huachuca Borgmeier, 1966 i c g
 Megaselia humeralis (Zetterstedt, 1836) i c g
 Megaselia humida Disney, 1991 c g
 Megaselia hyalipennis (Wood, 1912) c g
 Megaselia hybrida Schmitz, 1939 c g
 Megaselia hypochaeta Borgmeier, 1969 c g
 Megaselia hypochondrica Borgmeier, 1966 i c g
 Megaselia hypopygialis (Lundbeck, 1920) c g

I

 Megaselia iberiensis Disney, 1999 c g
 Megaselia ignicornis Borgmeier, 1962 c g
 Megaselia ignobilis (Schmitz, 1919) c g
 Megaselia ilca Borgmeier, 1964 i c g
 Megaselia imbricata Borgmeier, 1961 c g
 Megaselia imitatrix Borgmeier, 1969 c g
 Megaselia immaculipes (Enderlein, 1912) c g
 Megaselia immodensior Buck & Disney, 2001 c g
 Megaselia immodesta Beyer, 1965 c g
 Megaselia impariseta Bridarolli, 1937 c g
 Megaselia imperfecta Borgmeier, 1967 c g
 Megaselia impinguata Schmitz, 1935 c g
 Megaselia impressa Borgmeier, 1962 c g
 Megaselia inaequalis (Brunetti, 1912) c g
 Megaselia incarum (Brues, 1915) c g
 Megaselia incisa (Malloch, 1912) c g
 Megaselia inclinata Borgmeier, 1971 c g
 Megaselia incompleta Brues, 1936 c g
 Megaselia incompressa Beyer, 1965 c g
 Megaselia incongruens Schmitz, 1940 c g
 Megaselia inconspicua Borgmeier, 1967 c g
 Megaselia incontaminata (Schmitz, 1926) c g
 Megaselia incostans (Santos Abreu, 1921) c g
 Megaselia incrassata (Schmitz, 1920) i c g
 Megaselia incrassaticosta Bridarolli, 1951 c g
 Megaselia indifferens (Lundbeck, 1920) c g
 Megaselia indigesta (Schmitz, 1920) c g
 Megaselia indistincta De Meijere, 1929 g
 Megaselia inflaticornis Brues, 1936 c g
 Megaselia inflatipes Brues, 1936 c g
 Megaselia infracta Beyer, 1965 c g
 Megaselia infraposita (Wood, 1909) c g
 Megaselia infumata (Malloch, 1912) i c g
 Megaselia innocens (Collin, 1912) c g
 Megaselia innotata Beyer, 1958 c g
 Megaselia inornata (Malloch, 1912) i c g
 Megaselia inquinata Schmitz, 1953 c g
 Megaselia insecta Schmitz, 1953
 Megaselia insignicauda Disney, 2008 c g
 Megaselia insolens Beyer, 1965 c g
 Megaselia insons (Lundbeck, 1920) c g
 Megaselia integra Borgmeier, 1964 i c g
 Megaselia intercedens Beyer, 1965 c g
 Megaselia intercostata (Lundbeck, 1921) c g
 Megaselia intergeriva Schmitz, 1948 c g
 Megaselia intermedia Santos Abreu, 1921 g
 Megaselia intersecta Schmitz, 1935 c g
 Megaselia intonsa Schmitz, 1948 c g
 Megaselia introlapsa Schmitz, 1937 c g
 Megaselia invenusta (Collin, 1912) c g
 Megaselia invernessae Disney, 1988 c g
 Megaselia involuta (Wood, 1910) c g
 Megaselia irene Borgmeier, 1962 c g
 Megaselia iroquoiana (Malloch, 1912) i c g
 Megaselia irregularis Beyer, 1958 c g
 Megaselia irwini Disney, 1979 c g
 Megaselia isaacmajorum  g
 Megaselia isis Borgmeier, 1962 c g
 Megaselia ismayi Disney, 1978 c g
 Megaselia ivanis Garcia-Romera g

J-K

 Megaselia jameslamonti Disney, 1995 c g
 Megaselia jani Disney, 2012
 Megaselia jheringi (Borgmeier, 1923) c g
 Megaselia joannae Disney, 1998 c g
 Megaselia jochiana Schmitz, 1957 c g
 Megaselia johnsoni (Brues, 1916) i c g
 Megaselia jorgensis Disney, 1991 c g
 Megaselia juli (Brues, 1908) i c g
 Megaselia juxtaplantata Borgmeier, 1962 c g
 Megaselia juxtaposita Borgmeier, 1962 c g
 Megaselia kanekoi Disney, 1989 c g
 Megaselia kanoi Disney, 1989 c g
 Megaselia keiseri Beyer, 1965 c g
 Megaselia kelleri  g
 Megaselia killarneyensis Disney, 1988 c g
 Megaselia kodongi Disney, 1986 c g
 Megaselia kofferi Schmitz i g
 Megaselia kolana Schmitz, 1928 c g
 Megaselia konnovi Michailovskaya, 2003 c g
 Megaselia kovaci Disney, 1991 c g
 Megaselia kozlovi Disney, 2013 g
 Megaselia krizelji Delage & Lauraire, 1970 g
 Megaselia kuenburgi Schmitz, 1938 c g
 Megaselia kurahashii Disney, 1985 c g
 Megaselia kurinai Disney in Disney, Kurina, Tedersoo & Cakpo, 2013

L

 Megaselia labellaspinata Buck & Disney, 2001 c g
 Megaselia labellata Borgmeier, 1962 c g
 Megaselia labellifera Borgmeier, 1969 c g
 Megaselia labialis Brues, 1936 c g
 Megaselia labiata Borgmeier, 1967 c g
 Megaselia labiella Beyer, 1965 c g
 Megaselia labrosa Borgmeier, 1963 c g
 Megaselia lactipennis (Lundbeck, 1920) c g
 Megaselia lacunitarsalis  g
 Megaselia lacustris Borgmeier, 1966 i c g
 Megaselia laeta (Lundbeck, 1920) c g
 Megaselia laeviceps Schmitz, 1948 c g
 Megaselia laevigata Borgmeier, 1971 c g
 Megaselia laevigoides Borgmeier, 1971 c g
 Megaselia laevubrevis Disney, 2003 c g
 Megaselia laffooni Robinson, 1978 i c g
 Megaselia lalunensis Brues, 1936 c g
 Megaselia lamellicauda Borgmeier, 1966 i c g
 Megaselia lanata Robinson, 1981 i c g
 Megaselia lanceata Borgmeier, 1962 i c g
 Megaselia lanceolata (Brues, 1924) c g
 Megaselia languescens (Schmitz, 1924) c g
 Megaselia lapponica Schmitz, 1928 c g
 Megaselia largifrontalis Schmitz, 1939 c g
 Megaselia larvivora Disney in Stoepler & Disney, 2013
 Megaselia lata (Wood, 1910) c g
 Megaselia latangula Borgmeier, 1962 c g
 Megaselia lateicauda (Borgmeier, 1925) i g
 Megaselia lateralis Schmitz, 1926 c g
 Megaselia latericia Schmitz, 1935 c g
 Megaselia latibasis Borgmeier, 1964 i c g
 Megaselia laticosta Schmitz, 1938 c g
 Megaselia laticrus Schmitz, 1927 c g
 Megaselia latifasciata (Brunetti, 1912) c g
 Megaselia latifemorata (Becker, 1901) c g
 Megaselia latifrons (Wood, 1910) c g
 Megaselia latifurca Borgmeier, 1967 c g
 Megaselia latimanus (Malloch, 1914) c
 Megaselia latinervis (Collin, 1912) c g
 Megaselia latior Schmitz, 1936 c g
 Megaselia latipalpis (Schmitz, 1921) c g
 Megaselia latipennis Borgmeier, 1966 i c g
 Megaselia latipes Borgmeier, 1933 c g
 Megaselia latirostris Borgmeier, 1962 c g
 Megaselia latitarsus Beyer, 1958 c g
 Megaselia lavoursensis Disney, 2011 g
 Megaselia laxa Borgmeier, 1967 c g
 Megaselia leleupi Beyer, 1960 c g
 Megaselia lenis Borgmeier, 1962 c g
 Megaselia leptacina Borgmeier, 1969 c g
 Megaselia leptofemur Disney, 2007 c g
 Megaselia leucopleuralis Disney, 2006 c g
 Megaselia leucozona Schmitz, 1930 c g
 Megaselia levifrons Borgmeier, 1962 c g
 Megaselia lilliput Beyer, 1959 c g
 Megaselia limburgensis (Schmitz, 1918) b
 Megaselia limpachensis Rondani, 1856 g
 Megaselia lindbergi Beyer, 1959 c g
 Megaselia lindneri Beyer, 1959 c g
 Megaselia lineata Borgmeier, 1971 c g
 Megaselia lineatipes Borgmeier, 1967 c g
 Megaselia linoensis Brues, 1936 c g
 Megaselia littoralis (Malloch, 1914) c g
 Megaselia llanquihuea Schmitz, 1929 c g
 Megaselia lobatafurcae Disney, 2009
 Megaselia lombardorum  g
 Megaselia longianalis Garcia-Romera g
 Megaselia longibarba Beyer, 1964 i c g
 Megaselia longicauda Bridarolli, 1951 c g
 Megaselia longiciliata (Strobl, 1899) c g
 Megaselia longicostalis (Wood, 1912) c g
 Megaselia longifurca Lundbeck, 1921
 Megaselia longinqua Bridarolli, 1937 c g
 Megaselia longipalpis (Wood, 1910) c g
 Megaselia longipennis (Malloch, 1912) i c g
 Megaselia longiseta (Wood, 1909) c g
 Megaselia longispina (Silva Figueroa, 1916) c g
 Megaselia longistyla Brenner, 2004 c g
 Megaselia longula Borgmeier, 1962 c g
 Megaselia lucida Bridarolli, 1937 c g
 Megaselia lucifrons (Schmitz, 1918) c g
 Megaselia lucipleura Borgmeier, 1962 c g
 Megaselia luctuosa (Santos Abreu, 1921) c g
 Megaselia luederwaldti (Enderlein, 1912) c g
 Megaselia lugens Borgmeier, 1962 c g
 Megaselia luisieri Schmitz, 1939 c g
 Megaselia luminifrons (Schmitz, 1926) c g
 Megaselia luminosa Schmitz, 1952 c g
 Megaselia lunaris Borgmeier, 1961 c g
 Megaselia lutea (Meigen, 1830) i c g
 Megaselia luteicauda (Borgmeier, 1925) c g
 Megaselia luteiclava Borgmeier, 1967 c g
 Megaselia luteicoxa Borgmeier, 1962 c g
 Megaselia luteifasciata (Borgmeier, 1925) c g
 Megaselia luteipes (Schmitz, 1918) c g
 Megaselia luteiventris Borgmeier, 1971 c g
 Megaselia lutella Schmitz, 1929 c g
 Megaselia luteoides Schmitz, 1926 c g
 Megaselia lutescens (Wood, 1910) c g

M

 Megaselia macrochaeta (Malloch, 1912) c g
 Megaselia maculafemoralis Disney, 2008 c g
 Megaselia maculiapex Borgmeier, 1935 c g
 Megaselia maculifera Beyer, 1965 c g
 Megaselia maculipennis Brues, 1936 c g
 Megaselia maculithorax Borgmeier, 1971 c g
 Megaselia madeiraensis Disney, 2007 c g
 Megaselia magignobilis Disney, 2010
 Megaselia magna Beyer, 1959 c g
 Megaselia magnifica (Lundbeck, 1920) c g
 Megaselia mainitensis Brues, 1936 c g
 Megaselia major (Wood, 1912) c g
 Megaselia malaisei Beyer, 1958 c g
 Megaselia malayae Borgmeier, 1967 c g
 Megaselia malhamensis Disney, 1986 c g
 Megaselia mallochi (Wood, 1909) c g
 Megaselia malvinasensis Disney, 1989 c g
 Megaselia mammillata Borgmeier, 1959 c g
 Megaselia manca (Brues, 1907) c g
 Megaselia manicata (Wood, 1910) c g
 Megaselia manselli Disney, 1997 c g
 Megaselia mantuana Gori, 2005 c g
 Megaselia manualis (Malloch, 1912) c g
 Megaselia maranguensis Beyer, 1960 c g
 Megaselia marekdurskii Disney, 1998 c g
 Megaselia marekudurskii Disney, 1998 c g
 Megaselia marginalis (Malloch, 1912) i c g
 Megaselia marina Schmitz, 1937 c g
 Megaselia marklanei Disney, 2001 g
 Megaselia marquezi  g
 Megaselia martensi Disney, 1999 c g
 Megaselia masatierrana (Enderlein, 1938) c g
 Megaselia maura (Wood, 1910) c g
 Megaselia mcleani Disney, 1987 c g
 Megaselia meconicera (Speiser, 1925) i c g
 Megaselia media (Collin, 1912) c g
 Megaselia mediata Brues, 1936 c g
 Megaselia mediocris Borgmeier, 1967 c g
 Megaselia mediocristata Beyer, 1965 c g
 Megaselia mediterranea Schmitz, 1935 c g
 Megaselia megachaeta Borgmeier, 1971 c g
 Megaselia megaglossa Disney, 1982 c g
 Megaselia megasetigera Disney, 2003 c g
 Megaselia meigeni (Becker, 1901) c g
 Megaselia meijerei (Brues, 1915) c g
 Megaselia melanderi Borgmeier, 1964 i c g
 Megaselia melanocephala (Roser, 1840) c g
 Megaselia melanocholica Beyer, 1960 c g
 Megaselia melanostola Schmitz, 1942 c g
 Megaselia mellea Borgmeier, 1962 c g
 Megaselia mendax Borgmeier, 1962 c g
 Megaselia mera (Collin, 1912) c g
 Megaselia meracula (Brues, 1911) c g
 Megaselia meridiana Brenner, 2006 c g
 Megaselia meridionalis (Brues, 1907) c
 Megaselia meruensis Beyer, 1960 c g
 Megaselia mesochaeta Borgmeier, 1962 c g
 Megaselia metatarsalis Borgmeier, 1969 c g
 Megaselia metropolitanoensis Disney, 2001 c g
 Megaselia micantifrons Beyer, 1965 c g
 Megaselia michaelis (Schmitz, 1915) c g
 Megaselia michali Disney, 1998 c g
 Megaselia microcera Borgmeier, 1962 c g
 Megaselia microcurtineura Disney, 1991 c g
 Megaselia micronesiae Beyer, 1967 c g
 Megaselia miguelensis Disney, 2007 c g
 Megaselia mikejohnsoni  g
 Megaselia miki Schmitz, 1929 c g
 Megaselia mimica Borgmeier, 1962 c g
 Megaselia mimodensior Buck & Disney, 2001 c g
 Megaselia miniseta Disney, 1991 c g
 Megaselia minor (Zetterstedt, 1848) c g
 Megaselia minuta (Aldrich, 1892) i c g
 Megaselia minutior Borgmeier, 1966 i c g
 Megaselia minutussima (Brues, 1905) c g
 Megaselia miripyga Borgmeier, 1967 c g
 Megaselia miristigma Borgmeier, 1962 c g
 Megaselia mixta (Schmitz, 1918) c g
 Megaselia mixticolor Beyer, 1958 c g
 Megaselia moderata Borgmeier, 1967 c g
 Megaselia modesta (Brues, 1919) i c g
 Megaselia modica Beyer, 1965 c g
 Megaselia modificata Borgmeier, 1962 c g
 Megaselia moesta Borgmeier, 1962 c g
 Megaselia monochaeta Strobl, 1892 g
 Megaselia monochaetina Borgmeier, 1968 i c g
 Megaselia montana Schmitz, 1935 c g
 Megaselia monticola (Malloch, 1912) i c g
 Megaselia montseniensis Garcia-Romera g
 Megaselia morani Disney, 1982 c g
 Megaselia morella Borgmeier, 1967 c g
 Megaselia morena Borgmeier, 1962 c g
 Megaselia morosa Beyer, 1965 c g
 Megaselia mortenseni (Lundbeck, 1920) c g
 Megaselia morula Borgmeier, 1962 c g
 Megaselia mountfieldensis Disney, 2003 c g
 Megaselia mucronifera Borgmeier, 1967 c g
 Megaselia multispinulosa Disney, 2003 c g
 Megaselia multivesiculae Disney, 2006 c g
 Megaselia munita Borgmeier, 1962 c g
 Megaselia murakamii Disney, 1989 c g
 Megaselia mutata Brues, 1936 c g
 Megaselia mutica Borgmeier, 1962 c g
 Megaselia mutilata Borgmeier, 1969 c g

N

 Megaselia naevia Borgmeier, 1962 c g
 Megaselia nana (Brues, 1911) c g
 Megaselia nanilla Borgmeier, 1962 c g
 Megaselia nantucketensis  b
 Megaselia nasoni (Malloch, 1914)
 Megaselia natalicola Beyer, 1960 c g
 Megaselia nebulosa Bridarolli, 1951 c g
 Megaselia necmera Disney, 2006 c g
 Megaselia necrophaga (Enderlein, 1912) c g
 Megaselia necscabra Disney, 2008 c g
 Megaselia nectama Disney, 1991 c g
 Megaselia nectergata Disney, 1999 c g
 Megaselia nefeloptera Bridarolli, 1951 c g
 Megaselia neivai (Bridarolli, 1940) c g
 Megaselia nemorensis (Santos Abreu, 1921) c g
 Megaselia neocorynurae Gonzalez, Brown & Ospina, 2002 c g
 Megaselia nepenthina Schmitz, 1955 c g
 Megaselia nephelodes Borgmeier, 1962 c g
 Megaselia nepos Borgmeier, 1961 c g
 Megaselia nesiotica Borgmeier, 1967 c g
 Megaselia nestor Borgmeier, 1971 c g
 Megaselia nidanurae Disney, 1995 c g
 Megaselia nigella Beyer, 1960 c g
 Megaselia nigellifrons Borgmeier, 1967 c g
 Megaselia nigelloides Borgmeier, 1962 c g
 Megaselia nigra (Meigen, 1830) i c g
 Megaselia nigrescens (Wood, 1910) c g
 Megaselia nigribasis Beyer, 1966 c g
 Megaselia nigricauda Beyer, 1965 c g
 Megaselia nigricens (Wood, 1910) g
 Megaselia nigriceps (Loew, 1866) i c g
 Megaselia nigricia Disney & Durska, 2011
 Megaselia nigriclava (Strobl, 1909) c g
 Megaselia nigricornis Mikhailovskaya, 1991 c g
 Megaselia nigricorpus Beyer, 1959 c g
 Megaselia nigrifemorata (Santos Abreu, 1921) c g
 Megaselia nigripalpis (Lundbeck, 1920) c g
 Megaselia nigrita Borgmeier, 1962 c g
 Megaselia nigritula (Santos Abreu, 1921) c g
 Megaselia nigriventris Bridarolli, 1951 c g
 Megaselia nigrofascipes Borgmeier, 1962 c g
 Megaselia nitidifrons (Strobl, 1892) c g
 Megaselia nitidipennis Bridarolli, 1951 c g
 Megaselia nocturnalis Brues, 1936 c g
 Megaselia norica Schmitz, 1929 c g
 Megaselia notabilis Beyer, 1965 c g
 Megaselia notipennis Borgmeier, 1962 c g
 Megaselia nubila Colyer, 1952 c g
 Megaselia nubilifurca Borgmeier, 1967 c g
 Megaselia nubilipennis Schmitz, 1952 i c g
 Megaselia nudihalterata Disney, 2006 c g
 Megaselia nudilobulus Disney, 2003 c g
 Megaselia nudipalpis Borgmeier, 1962 c g
 Megaselia nudipleura (Beyer, 1958)
 Megaselia nussbaumi Disney, 2004 c g

O

 Megaselia oblongifrons Schmitz, 1939 c g
 Megaselia obscura (Brues, 1904) c g
 Megaselia obscurata (Enderlein, 1912) c g
 Megaselia obscurella Borgmeier, 1962 c g
 Megaselia obscuricauda Beyer, 1966 c g
 Megaselia obscuripalpis Borgmeier, 1969 c g
 Megaselia obscuripennis (Wood, 1909) c g
 Megaselia obscuriterga Beyer, 1958 c g
 Megaselia obscuriventris Bridarolli, 1951 c g
 Megaselia ochracea (Brues, 1911) c g
 Megaselia ochreola Borgmeier, 1962 c g
 Megaselia ochripes Schmitz, 1953 c g
 Megaselia ocilferia Schmitz, 1939 c g
 Megaselia ocliferia Schmitz, 1939 g
 Megaselia offuscata (Schmitz, 1921) c g
 Megaselia okazakii Disney, 1989 c g
 Megaselia oligoseta Disney, 1987 c g
 Megaselia onis Mostovski & Disney, 2002 c g
 Megaselia opacicornis Schmitz, 1949 c g
 Megaselia orbata Borgmeier, 1967 c g
 Megaselia orestes Borgmeier, 1966 i c g
 Megaselia orgaoa Disney, 1991 c g
 Megaselia orientata (Malloch, 1912) c g
 Megaselia orthoneura Borgmeier, 1962 c g
 Megaselia ostravaensis Disney, 2008 c g
 Megaselia oviaraneae Disney, 1999 c g
 Megaselia oweni Disney, 1988 c g
 Megaselia oxboroughae  g
 Megaselia oxybelorum Schmitz, 1928 c g

P

 Megaselia pabloi Brown, 1994 c g
 Megaselia pachydactyla Schmitz, 1953 c g
 Megaselia pagei Disney, 1987 c g
 Megaselia pagolacartei Disney, 2012
 Megaselia palaestinensis (Enderlein, 1933) c g
 Megaselia pallicornis (Brunetti, 1912) c g
 Megaselia pallidantennata Beyer, 1960 c g
 Megaselia pallidicauda Brues, 1936 c g
 Megaselia pallidifemur Borgmeier, 1962 c g
 Megaselia pallidipalpis Bridarolli, 1951 c g
 Megaselia pallidipennis Borgmeier, 1969 c g
 Megaselia pallidivena Borgmeier, 1967 c g
 Megaselia pallidizona (Lundbeck, 1920) c g
 Megaselia palmeni (Becker, 1901) c g
 Megaselia palmi Brenner, 2006 c g
 Megaselia palpata (Brues, 1919) i c g
 Megaselia palpella Beyer, 1967 c g
 Megaselia paludosa (Wood, 1908) c g
 Megaselia pamirica Naumov, 1979 c g
 Megaselia pangmaphae Disney, 2006 c g
 Megaselia papayae Borgmeier, 1966 i c g
 Megaselia papei Disney, 2006 c g
 Megaselia parabasiseta Bohart, 1947 c g
 Megaselia parachaeta Borgmeier, 1962 c g
 Megaselia paraensis Borgmeier, 1971 c g
 Megaselia paraprocta Borgmeier, 1964 i c g
 Megaselia parasitica (Malloch, 1915) c g
 Megaselia parastigmatica Borgmeier, 1962 c g
 Megaselia paricostalis Schmitz, 1929 c g
 Megaselia parnassia Disney, 1986 c g
 Megaselia parspallida Disney, 2009
 Megaselia parumhirta Beyer, 1965 c g
 Megaselia paruminflata Beyer, 1958 c g
 Megaselia parumlevata Schmitz, 1936 c g
 Megaselia parva (Wood, 1909) c g
 Megaselia parviseta Borgmeier, 1969 c g
 Megaselia parvorata Disney, 1991 c g
 Megaselia parvula Schmitz, 1930 c g
 Megaselia patellata Beyer, 1966 c g
 Megaselia patellipes Brues, 1936 c g
 Megaselia patellipyga Borgmeier, 1967 c g
 Megaselia patula Schmitz, 1936 c g
 Megaselia pauculitincta Beyer, 1959 c g
 Megaselia paula Borgmeier, 1969 c g
 Megaselia paupera (Lundbeck, 1920) c g
 Megaselia paupercula Borgmeier, 1962 c g
 Megaselia pauxilla (Brues, 1907) c g
 Megaselia peckorum Disney, 2008 c g
 Megaselia pecten Brenner, 2006 c g
 Megaselia pectinifera Schmitz, 1926 c g
 Megaselia pectoraliformis Colyer, 1962 c g
 Megaselia pectoralis (Wood, 1910) c g
 Megaselia pectorella Schmitz, 1929 c g
 Megaselia pectunculata Schmitz, 1927 c g
 Megaselia pedalis Beyer, 1960 c g
 Megaselia pedatella (Schmitz, 1926) c g
 Megaselia pedicellata (Brues, 1924) c g
 Megaselia penicillata (Borgmeier, 1925) c
 Megaselia peniculifera Beyer, 1965 c g
 Megaselia pentagonalifrons Beyer, 1965 c g
 Megaselia pentagonalis Bridarolli, 1951 c g
 Megaselia peraffinis Beyer, 1958 c g
 Megaselia percaeca Beyer, 1965 c g
 Megaselia perdistans (Schmitz, 1924) c g
 Megaselia perdita (Malloch, 1912) i c g
 Megaselia perfraea Schmitz, 1934 c g
 Megaselia perfusca Schmitz, 1935 c g
 Megaselia perichaeta Borgmeier, 1964 i c g
 Megaselia pernigra (Santos Abreu, 1921) c g
 Megaselia perplexa (Malloch, 1912) i c g
 Megaselia perspicua Borgmeier, 1969 c g
 Megaselia perspinosa Brues, 1936 c g
 Megaselia pertincta Beyer, 1958 c g
 Megaselia perumbrata Brues, 1936 c g
 Megaselia peruviana (Brues, 1905) c g
 Megaselia peterseni Disney, 1994 c g
 Megaselia petraea Schmitz, 1934 g
 Megaselia peyresquensis Delage, 1974 c g
 Megaselia phoebe Borgmeier, 1962 c g
 Megaselia phoenicura (Schmitz, 1926) c g
 Megaselia piccola Borgmeier, 1966 i c g
 Megaselia piceata Borgmeier, 1962 c g
 Megaselia picta (Lehmann, 1822) i c g
 Megaselia pictella Beyer, 1965 c g
 Megaselia picticolor Beyer, 1958 c g
 Megaselia picticornis Borgmeier, 1962 c g
 Megaselia pictoides Beyer, 1965 c g
 Megaselia pictorufa (Colyer, 1957)
 Megaselia piliclasper Borgmeier, 1971 c g
 Megaselia pilicrus Borgmeier, 1964 i c g
 Megaselia pilifemur (Lundbeck, 1921) c g
 Megaselia pilifera Brues, 1936 c g
 Megaselia pilifrons (Silva Figueroa, 1916) c g
 Megaselia pilipyga Borgmeier, 1964 i c g
 Megaselia piliventris Schmitz, 1937 c g
 Megaselia pilosella Beyer, 1965 c g
 Megaselia pirirostris Borgmeier, 1962 c g
 Megaselia pisanoi  g
 Megaselia plagiata Borgmeier, 1962 c g
 Megaselia planifrons (Brues, 1905) c g
 Megaselia planipes (Collin, 1912) c g
 Megaselia plaumanni Borgmeier, 1971 c g
 Megaselia plebeia (Malloch, 1914) i c g
 Megaselia pleuralis (Wood, 1909) i c g
 Megaselia pleurochaeta Borgmeier, 1969 c g
 Megaselia pleurofascia Borgmeier, 1962 c g
 Megaselia pleurota Disney, 1994 c g
 Megaselia plurispinulosa (Zetterstedt, 1860) c g
 Megaselia plutei Borgmeier, 1971 c g
 Megaselia polidorii Disney, 2006 c g
 Megaselia polita (Enderlein, 1912) c g
 Megaselia politiceps Borgmeier, 1967 c g
 Megaselia politifrons Brues, 1936 c g
 Megaselia pollex Schmitz, 1937 c g
 Megaselia polonica Disney & Durska, 1999 c g
 Megaselia polychaeta Borgmeier, 1967 c g
 Megaselia polyporicola Borgmeier, 1966 i c g
 Megaselia postcrinata Borgmeier, 1966 i c g
 Megaselia posticata (Strobl, 1898) c g
 Megaselia postorta Borgmeier, 1967 c g
 Megaselia prachavali Disney, 2006 c g
 Megaselia praeacuta (Schmitz, 1919) c g
 Megaselia praedafura Disney, 1997 c g
 Megaselia praefulgens Beyer, 1965 c g
 Megaselia praeminens Beyer, 1965 c g
 Megaselia pressicauda Borgmeier, 1964 i c g
 Megaselia pressifrons Schmitz, 1929 c g
 Megaselia pristina Borgmeier, 1962 c g
 Megaselia privata Borgmeier, 1967 c g
 Megaselia procera Borgmeier, 1966 i c g
 Megaselia proclinata Borgmeier, 1964 i c g
 Megaselia prodroma (Lundbeck, 1921) c g
 Megaselia producta (Schmitz, 1921) c g
 Megaselia prolixa Borgmeier, 1958 c g
 Megaselia prolixifurca Kung & Brown, 2004 c g
 Megaselia prolongata Schmitz, 1954 c g
 Megaselia propinqua (Wood, 1909) c g
 Megaselia propior Colyer, 1956 c g
 Megaselia prosthioxantha (Enderlein, 1912) c g
 Megaselia protarsalis Schmitz, 1927 c g
 Megaselia protarsella Beyer, 1965 c g
 Megaselia pruinosa (Malloch, 1914) c g
 Megaselia pruinosifrons Borgmeier, 1962 c g
 Megaselia pseudociliata (Strobl, 1910) c g
 Megaselia pseudogiraudii (Schmitz, 1920) c g
 Megaselia pseudomera Disney, 2006 c g
 Megaselia pseudopicta (Lundbeck, 1922) c g
 Megaselia pseudoscalaris (Senior-White, 1924) c g
 Megaselia pteryacantha (Borgmeier, 1925) c g
 Megaselia pubecula Schmitz, 1927 c g
 Megaselia pulcherrima (Santos Abreu, 1921) c g
 Megaselia pulicaria (Fallen, 1823) i c g
 Megaselia pulicaripar Beyer, 1959 c g
 Megaselia pulla (Brues, 1919) i c g
 Megaselia pulliclava Borgmeier, 1969 c g
 Megaselia pullifrons Beyer, 1958 c g
 Megaselia pullipalpis Colyer, 1962 c g
 Megaselia pulveroboleti Disney, 1998 c g
 Megaselia pumila (Meigen, 1830) c g
 Megaselia punctata Bridarolli, 1951 c g
 Megaselia punctifrons Borgmeier, 1969 c g
 Megaselia punctipes Borgmeier, 1962 c g
 Megaselia purificata Borgmeier, 1967 c g
 Megaselia pusilla (Meigen, 1830) i c g
 Megaselia putescavi Disney, 2011 g
 Megaselia pygidialis Beyer, 1965 c g
 Megaselia pygmaea (Zetterstedt, 1848) c g
 Megaselia pygmaeoides (Lundbeck, 1921) i c g
 Megaselia pygmaeola Borgmeier, 1966 i c g

Q

 Megaselia quadrata Brues, 1936 c g
 Megaselia quadribrevis Disney, 2003 c g
 Megaselia quadripunctata (Malloch, 1918) i c g
 Megaselia quadriseta Schmitz, 1918 c g
 Megaselia quadrispinosa Brues, 1936 c g
 Megaselia quadrupliciseta Bridarolli, 1951 c g
 Megaselia quartobrevis Beyer, 1965 c g
 Megaselia quartobsoleta Borgmeier, 1969 c g
 Megaselia quartocurta Borgmeier, 1969 c g
 Megaselia quartolutea Borgmeier, 1963 c g
 Megaselia quartopallida Beyer, 1965 c g
 Megaselia quattuorbrevis Disney, 2008 c g
 Megaselia quintincisa Disney, 2006 c g

R

 Megaselia raetica Schmitz, 1934 c g
 Megaselia ramierzi Bridarolli, 1951 c g
 Megaselia rara Colyer, 1962 c g
 Megaselia raruvesiculae Buck & Disney, 2001 c g
 Megaselia recta (Brues, 1911) c g
 Megaselia rectangulata (Malloch, 1914) c
 Megaselia reducta Borgmeier, 1966 i c g
 Megaselia relicta Borgmeier, 1964 i c g
 Megaselia renata Borgmeier, 1964 i c g
 Megaselia renwickorum  g
 Megaselia repetenda Brues, 1936 c g
 Megaselia retardata (Malloch, 1912) i c g
 Megaselia rettenmeyeri Disney, 2007 c g
 Megaselia reversa Brues, 1936 c g
 Megaselia reynoldsi Disney, 1981 c g
 Megaselia rhabdopalpis Borgmeier, 1962 c g
 Megaselia richardsoni Disney, 2003 c g
 Megaselia riefi Brenner, 2006 c g
 Megaselia rimacensis Brues, 1944 c g
 Megaselia rivalis (Wood, 1909) c g
 Megaselia robertsoni Disney, 2008 c g
 Megaselia robinsoni Disney, 1981 c g
 Megaselia robusta Schmitz, 1928 i c g
 Megaselia rodriguezorum  g
 Megaselia romeralensis Disney, 2009
 Megaselia romphaea (Schmitz, 1947)
 Megaselia rotunda Robinson, 1981 i c g
 Megaselia rotundapicis Disney, 1999 c g
 Megaselia rotundicauda Beyer, 1965 c g
 Megaselia rotundula Borgmeier, 1966 i c g
 Megaselia rubella (Schmitz, 1920) c g
 Megaselia rubescens (Wood, 1912) c g
 Megaselia rubicornis (Schmitz, 1919) c g
 Megaselia rubida (Schmitz, 1918) c g
 Megaselia rubricornis (Schmitz, 1919) g
 Megaselia rubronigra Borgmeier, 1962 c g
 Megaselia rudimentalis Borgmeier, 1962 c g
 Megaselia rudis (Wood, 1909) c g
 Megaselia rufa (Wood, 1908) c g
 Megaselia ruficornis (Meigen, 1830) i c g
 Megaselia rufifrons (Wood, 1910) c g
 Megaselia rufipennis (Macquart, 1835) c g
 Megaselia rufipes (Meigen, 1804) i c g b  (coffin fly)
 Megaselia rupestris Schmitz, 1934 c g
 Megaselia ruralis Schmitz, 1937 c g
 Megaselia russellensis Disney, 2003 c g
 Megaselia rustica (Brues, 1905) c g
 Megaselia rutilipes Beyer, 1958 c g

S

 Megaselia sacatelensis  g
 Megaselia sacculata Borgmeier, 1958 c g
 Megaselia sacculifera Beyer, 1965 c g
 Megaselia safuneae Malloch, 1935 c g
 Megaselia sakaiae Disney, 2001 c g
 Megaselia samoana Borgmeier, 1967 c g
 Megaselia sandhui Disney, 1981 c g
 Megaselia sanguinea (Schmitz, 1922) c g
 Megaselia saprophaga Borgmeier, 1934 c g
 Megaselia sarae Garcia-Romera g
 Megaselia sauteri (Brues, 1911) c g
 Megaselia savannae Disney, 1991 c g
 Megaselia scabra Schmitz, 1926 c g
 Megaselia scalaris (Loew, 1866) i c g b
 Megaselia schildi Borgmeier, 1971 c g
 Megaselia schutti Schmitz, 1936 c g
 Megaselia schwarzi (Malloch, 1912) i c g
 Megaselia sciaricida Schmitz, 1932 c g
 Megaselia scissa Borgmeier, 1962 c g
 Megaselia scopalis (Brues, 1919) i c g
 Megaselia scopifera Brues, 1936 c g
 Megaselia scutellariformis Schmitz, 1926 c g
 Megaselia scutellaris (Wood, 1909) c g
 Megaselia scutelliseta Borgmeier, 1935 c g
 Megaselia seaverorum  g
 Megaselia seclusa Beyer, 1966 i c g
 Megaselia secreta Beyer, 1958 c g
 Megaselia sejuncta Beyer, 1967 c g
 Megaselia sembeli Disney, 1986 c g
 Megaselia semicrocea Borgmeier, 1964 i c g
 Megaselia semiferruginea Bridarolli, 1940 c g
 Megaselia semihyalina Beyer, 1960 c g
 Megaselia semilucens Borgmeier, 1967 c g
 Megaselia semilutea Borgmeier, 1962 c g
 Megaselia semimollis Borgmeier, 1971 c g
 Megaselia semipolita Borgmeier, 1961 c g
 Megaselia semota Beyer, 1959 c g
 Megaselia senegalensis Disney, 1980 c g
 Megaselia septentrionalis (Schmitz, 1919) c g
 Megaselia sepulchralis (Lundbeck, 1920) c g
 Megaselia sericata Schmitz, 1935 c g
 Megaselia serotina Borgmeier, 1962 c g
 Megaselia serpentina Borgmeier, 1962 c g
 Megaselia serrata (Wood, 1910) c g
 Megaselia setacea (Aldrich, 1892) i c g
 Megaselia setalis Beyer, 1958 c g
 Megaselia setaria (Malloch) i c g
 Megaselia setella Beyer, 1966 c g
 Megaselia seticauda (Malloch, 1914) i c g
 Megaselia seticerca Borgmeier, 1966 i c g
 Megaselia seticlasper Borgmeier, 1962 c g
 Megaselia seticosta Borgmeier, 1962 c g
 Megaselia setifemur Bohart, 1947 c g
 Megaselia setifer (Lundbeck, 1920) c g
 Megaselia setifimbria Borgmeier, 1971 c g
 Megaselia setifrons Brues, 1936 c g
 Megaselia setigera (Brues, 1919) c g
 Megaselia setimargo (Enderlein, 1912) c g
 Megaselia setipectus Borgmeier, 1971 c g
 Megaselia setipennis Borgmeier, 1967 c g
 Megaselia setiventris Borgmeier, 1962 c g
 Megaselia setulipalpis Schmitz, 1938 c g
 Megaselia sevciki Disney, 2006 c g
 Megaselia sexcrinata Borgmeier, 1962 c g
 Megaselia sextaperta Beyer, 1958 c g
 Megaselia sextobsoleta Borgmeier, 1971 c g
 Megaselia sextohirta Beyer, 1966 c g
 Megaselia sextolutea Borgmeier, 1967 c g
 Megaselia sextovittata Lee & Disney, 2004 c g
 Megaselia seychellesensis Disney, 2006 c g
 Megaselia shannoni Borgmeier, 1966 i c g
 Megaselia shawi Disney, 2006 c g
 Megaselia sheppardi Disney, 1988 c g
 Megaselia shiyiluae Disney, Li & Li, 1995 c g
 Megaselia siamensis Beyer, 1966 c g
 Megaselia sibulanensis Brues, 1936 c g
 Megaselia sibylla Borgmeier, 1967 c g
 Megaselia sicaria (Colyer, 1962) c g
 Megaselia sidneyae  g
 Megaselia signabilis Beyer, 1965 c g
 Megaselia sihlwaldensis Rondani, 1856 g
 Megaselia silhouettensis Disney, 2005 c g
 Megaselia similifrons Schmitz, 1934 c g
 Megaselia similis (Silva Figueroa, 1916) c g
 Megaselia simiola Borgmeier, 1966 i c g
 Megaselia simplex (Wood, 1910) c g
 Megaselia simplicior (Brues, 1924) c g
 Megaselia simulans (Wood, 1912) c g
 Megaselia sinefurca Borgmeier, 1962 c g
 Megaselia sinuata Schmitz, 1926 c g
 Megaselia sinuosimargo Borgmeier, 1962 c g
 Megaselia smirnovi Naumov, 1979 c g
 Megaselia sobria Borgmeier, 1967 c g
 Megaselia socia Borgmeier, 1962 c g
 Megaselia sodalis (Brues, 1905) c g
 Megaselia sokotrana Beyer, 1965 c g
 Megaselia solita Beyer, 1958 c g
 Megaselia solitaria Schmitz, 1934
 Megaselia soluta (Collin, 1912) c g
 Megaselia sordescens Schmitz, 1927 i c g
 Megaselia sordida (Zetterstedt, 1838) i c g
 Megaselia sororpusilla Disney, 2012
 Megaselia southwoodi Disney, 1982 c g
 Megaselia specularis Schmitz, 1935 c g
 Megaselia speculifera Beyer, 1965 c g
 Megaselia speculigera Borgmeier, 1962 c g
 Megaselia speiseri Schmitz, 1929 c g
 Megaselia spelophila Borgmeier, 1966 i c g
 Megaselia spelunciphila Disney, 1999 c g
 Megaselia sphinx Borgmeier, 1962 i c g
 Megaselia spiculata Borgmeier, 1969 c g
 Megaselia spinata (Wood, 1910) c g
 Megaselia spinicincta (Wood, 1910) c g
 Megaselia spiniclasper Borgmeier, 1964 i c g
 Megaselia spinigera (Wood, 1908) c g
 Megaselia spinipectus Borgmeier, 1971 c g
 Megaselia spinipleura (Borgmeier, 1924) c
 Megaselia spinolabella Disney, 1989 c g
 Megaselia spinulata Borgmeier, 1964 i c g
 Megaselia spiracularis Schmitz, 1938 c g
 Megaselia splendens Borgmeier, 1967 c g
 Megaselia splendescens Beyer, 1965 c g
 Megaselia spodiaca (Schmitz, 1926) c g
 Megaselia spoliata Borgmeier, 1967 c g
 Megaselia spreta (Collin, 1912) c g
 Megaselia stackelbergi Mostovski & Disney, 2003 c g
 Megaselia stenoterga Disney, 1988 c g
 Megaselia stephanoidea (Borgmeier, 1925) c g
 Megaselia steptoeae  g
 Megaselia stichata (Lundbeck, 1920) c g
 Megaselia stigmatica (Schmitz, 1920) c g
 Megaselia stimulata Borgmeier, 1962 c g
 Megaselia straminipes (Malloch, 1912) i
 Megaselia striativentris Borgmeier, 1962 c g
 Megaselia stricta Borgmeier, 1962 c g
 Megaselia striolata Schmitz, 1940 c g
 Megaselia styloprocta (Schmitz, 1921) c g
 Megaselia suates Brenner, 2004 c g
 Megaselia subalpina Brenner, 2004 c g
 Megaselia subaristalis Borgmeier, 1969 c g
 Megaselia subatomella (Malloch, 1912) c g
 Megaselia subcarinata Borgmeier, 1962 c g
 Megaselia subcarpalis (Lundbeck, 1920) c g
 Megaselia subcavata Borgmeier, 1964 i c g
 Megaselia subcavifrons Borgmeier, 1971 c g
 Megaselia subconvexa (Lundbeck, 1920) c g
 Megaselia subcrinosa Borgmeier, 1962 c g
 Megaselia subcrocea Borgmeier, 1967 c g
 Megaselia subcuneata Borgmeier, 1962 c g
 Megaselia subflava (Malloch, 1912) c g
 Megaselia subfraudulenta Schmitz, 1933 c g
 Megaselia subfuscipes Schmitz, 1935 c g
 Megaselia subinflata Borgmeier, 1969 c g
 Megaselia sublutea (Malloch, 1912) i c g
 Megaselia submarginalis (Malloch, 1912) i c g
 Megaselia submimica Borgmeier, 1969 c g
 Megaselia subnitida Lundbeck g
 Megaselia subnudifemur Borgmeier, 1964 i c g
 Megaselia subnudipennis (Schmitz, 1919) c g
 Megaselia subnudiseta Beyer, 1958 c g
 Megaselia subobscurata (Malloch, 1912) i c g
 Megaselia subpalpalis (Lundbeck, 1920) c g
 Megaselia subpicta (Malloch, 1912) i c g
 Megaselia subpleuralis (Wood, 1909) i c g
 Megaselia subpyricornis Beyer, 1959 c g
 Megaselia subrecta Borgmeier, 1967 c g
 Megaselia subscaura Schmitz, 1932 c g
 Megaselia subsetella Borgmeier, 1967 c g
 Megaselia substricta Borgmeier, 1969 c g
 Megaselia subtumida (Wood, 1909) c g
 Megaselia subulicauda Schmitz, 1929 c g
 Megaselia subvittata Borgmeier, 1967 c g
 Megaselia suis Bohart, 1947 c g
 Megaselia sulcatifrons Borgmeier, 1967 c g
 Megaselia sulfurella Schmitz, 1926 c g
 Megaselia sulina Borgmeier, 1962 c g
 Megaselia sullivani Disney, 2003 c g
 Megaselia sulphurea Borgmeier, 1971 c g
 Megaselia sulphuripes (Meigen, 1830) c g
 Megaselia sulphuriventris (Borgmeier & Schmitz, 1923) c g
 Megaselia sulphurizona Borgmeier, 1966 i c g
 Megaselia superans Borgmeier, 1958 c g
 Megaselia supercilata (Wood, 1910) c g
 Megaselia superciliata (Wood, 1910) g
 Megaselia superfurcata Schmitz, 1928 c g
 Megaselia superpilosa Bridarolli, 1951 c g
 Megaselia supina Borgmeier, 1958 c g
 Megaselia surdifrons (Wood, 1909) c g
 Megaselia surophila Disney, 1991 c g
 Megaselia suspicata Borgmeier, 1967 c g
 Megaselia sylvatica (Wood, 1910) c g
 Megaselia sylvicola (Malloch, 1914) c g
 Megaselia symondsi Disney, 2002 c g

T

 Megaselia tabida Colyer, 1956 c g
 Megaselia tama (Schmitz, 1926) c g
 Megaselia tamanae Disney, 1995 c g
 Megaselia tamilnaduensis Disney, 1995 c g
 Megaselia tamoides Borgmeier, 1964 i c g
 Megaselia tanypalpis Kung & Brown, 2004 c g
 Megaselia tarsalis (Wood, 1910) c g
 Megaselia tarsella (Lundbeck, 1921) c g
 Megaselia tarsicia Schmitz, 1926 c g
 Megaselia tarsodes Borgmeier, 1969 c g
 Megaselia tasmaniensis (Malloch, 1912) c g
 Megaselia tecticauda Borgmeier, 1964 i c g
 Megaselia tedersooi Disney in Disney, Kurina, Tedersoo & Cakpo, 2013
 Megaselia tenebricior Beyer, 1967 c g
 Megaselia tenebricola Schmitz, 1934 c g
 Megaselia tenericoma Beyer, 1965 c g
 Megaselia teneripes Schmitz, 1957 c g
 Megaselia tenuibasis Beyer, 1960 c g
 Megaselia tenuicoma Beyer, 1960 c g
 Megaselia tenuicosta Beyer, 1965 c g
 Megaselia tenuiventris Schmitz, 1927 c g
 Megaselia teresamajewskae Disney, 1998 c g
 Megaselia tergalis Beyer, 1958 c g
 Megaselia tergata (Lundbeck, 1920) c g
 Megaselia tergatula Beyer, 1965 c g
 Megaselia tergitalis Borgmeier, 1961 c g
 Megaselia termimycana Disney, 1996 c g
 Megaselia termitomyca Disney, 1989 c g
 Megaselia termitomycana Disney, 1966 g
 Megaselia testacea Schmitz, 1938 c g
 Megaselia testaceicornis Borgmeier, 1967 c g
 Megaselia tetrabrevis Disney, 2003 c g
 Megaselia tetrachaeta Beyer, 1966 c g
 Megaselia tetraseta Disney, 2007 c g
 Megaselia tetrica Borgmeier, 1964 i c g
 Megaselia tetricifrons Beyer, 1967 c g
 Megaselia teutoniae Disney, 1989 c g
 Megaselia textilis Brues, 1936 c g
 Megaselia thaleri Brenner, 2006 c g
 Megaselia thalhammeri Schmitz, 1935 c g
 Megaselia tiagoensis Disney, 1991 c g
 Megaselia tibialis (Brues, 1905) c g
 Megaselia tibiella (Lundbeck, 1920) c g
 Megaselia tignorum Disney, 2009
 Megaselia tinctipennis Brues, 1936 c g
 Megaselia tinglei Disney, 1991 c g
 Megaselia tinteri Disney, 1998 c g
 Megaselia tomatoae Woolf, 1996 c g
 Megaselia tomskensis Naumov, 1992 c g
 Megaselia tonsipalpis Beyer, 1965 c g
 Megaselia tonyirwini Disney, 1988 c g
 Megaselia torautensis Disney, 1990 c g
 Megaselia totaflava Borgmeier, 1969 c g
 Megaselia totanigra Beyer, 1959 c g
 Megaselia transcarinata Borgmeier, 1971 c g
 Megaselia translocata Brues, 1936 c g
 Megaselia translucida Bridarolli, 1951 c g
 Megaselia transversalis De Meijere, 1929 g
 Megaselia transversiseta Bridarolli, 1951 c g
 Megaselia triapitsyni Michailovskaya, 2003 c g
 Megaselia trichopleurophora Beyer, 1960 c g
 Megaselia trichorrhoea (Schmitz, 1921) c g
 Megaselia trilineata (Brunetti, 1912) c g
 Megaselia trimacula  g
 Megaselia tripartita Borgmeier, 1961 c g
 Megaselia triplicicristae Disney, 2003 c g
 Megaselia tripliciseta Bridarolli, 1951 c g
 Megaselia triquetra Schmitz, 1927 c g
 Megaselia trisecta Brues, 1936 c g
 Megaselia tristis (Borgmeier, 1963) i c g
 Megaselia tritomegas Borgmeier, 1967 c g
 Megaselia trivialis (Brues, 1911) c g
 Megaselia trochanteralis Schmitz, 1953 c g
 Megaselia trochanterica Schmitz, 1926 c g
 Megaselia trochimczuki Disney & Durska, 2011
 Megaselia trogeri Brenner, 2006 c g
 Megaselia troglodytica Schmitz, 1950 c g
 Megaselia trojani Disney, 1998 c g
 Megaselia trudiae Disney, 2003 c g
 Megaselia tubulifera Borgmeier, 1962 c g
 Megaselia tubuliventris Bridarolli, 1951 c g
 Megaselia tulearensis Disney, 2005 c g
 Megaselia tumida (Wood, 1909) c g
 Megaselia tumidicornis Borgmeier, 1962 c g
 Megaselia tumidicosta Borgmeier, 1962 c g
 Megaselia tumidilla Borgmeier, 1962 c g
 Megaselia tumidirostris Borgmeier, 1969 c g
 Megaselia tumidula Borgmeier, 1962 c g
 Megaselia tumipalpis Bridarolli, 1951 c g
 Megaselia turbata Borgmeier, 1967 c g
 Megaselia turbidipennis Borgmeier, 1967 c g
 Megaselia turgida (Borgmeier, 1925) c
 Megaselia turgidilla Borgmeier, 1967 c g
 Megaselia turgipes Borgmeier, 1967 c g
 Megaselia tweedensis Disney, 2008 c g

U-V

 Megaselia uliginosa (Wood, 1909) c g
 Megaselia ultrabrevis Schmitz, 1927
 Megaselia umbrata Schmitz, 1936 c g
 Megaselia umbrosa Brues, 1936 c g
 Megaselia undulans Schmitz, 1940 c g
 Megaselia unguicularis (Wood, 1909) c g
 Megaselia ungulata Robinson, 1981 i c g
 Megaselia unichaeta Colyer, 1962 c g
 Megaselia unicolor (Schmitz, 1919) c g
 Megaselia unisetosa Brues, 1936 c g
 Megaselia unwini Disney, 1987 c g
 Megaselia ursina (Malloch, 1912) i c g
 Megaselia ussuriensis Mikhailovskaya, 1987 c g
 Megaselia usticlava Borgmeier, 1967 c g
 Megaselia ustipennis Borgmeier, 1967 c g
 Megaselia ustulata (Schmitz, 1920) c g
 Megaselia ustulithorax Beyer, 1965 c g
 Megaselia utingensis Borgmeier, 1971 c g
 Megaselia valida (Santos Abreu, 1921) c g
 Megaselia valvata Schmitz, 1935 c g
 Megaselia vannusetarum Disney, 2006 c g
 Megaselia vapidicornis Brues, 1936 c g
 Megaselia variana Schmitz, 1926 c g
 Megaselia variegata Schmitz, 1937 c g
 Megaselia venalis Beyer, 1966 c g
 Megaselia ventralis Borgmeier, 1963 i c g
 Megaselia verdensis Disney, 1991 c g
 Megaselia verna Schmitz, 1932 c g
 Megaselia vernalis (Wood, 1909) c g
 Megaselia vernicosa Beyer, 1966 c g
 Megaselia vernicosior Beyer, 1966 c g
 Megaselia verralli (Wood, 1910) c g
 Megaselia versicolor Borgmeier, 1967 c g
 Megaselia vespertilionis Borgmeier, 1962 c g
 Megaselia vestita (Wood, 1914) c g
 Megaselia victorovi Mikhailovskaya, 1991 c g
 Megaselia viduata (Collin, 1912) c g
 Megaselia villicauda Schmitz, 1927 c g
 Megaselia villosa Michailovskaya, 2003 c g
 Megaselia vinculata Borgmeier, 1964 i c g
 Megaselia violata Borgmeier, 1969 c g
 Megaselia virescens Bridarolli, 1951 c g
 Megaselia virilis (Schmitz, 1919) c g
 Megaselia vitiomera Disney, 2006 c g
 Megaselia vittata Borgmeier, 1967 c g
 Megaselia vorata Disney, 1991 c g
 Megaselia vulcanica Bridarolli, 1951 c g

W-Z

 Megaselia waagei Schmitz, 1935 c g
 Megaselia weissflogi Disney, 1998 c g
 Megaselia wellingtonensis Disney, 2003 c g
 Megaselia wheeleri Borgmeier, 1967 c g
 Megaselia wickenensis Disney, 2000 c g
 Megaselia wiegmanae  g
 Megaselia wigtownensis Disney, 2009
 Megaselia winnemana (Malloch, 1912) i c g
 Megaselia winqvisti Disney, 2011
 Megaselia withersi Disney, 2008 c g
 Megaselia woodi (Lundbeck, 1922) c g
 Megaselia wuzhiensis Fang, 2005 c g
 Megaselia xanthocera Borgmeier, 1967 c g
 Megaselia xanthogastra Schmitz, 1940 c g
 Megaselia xanthophila Buck & Disney, 2001 c g
 Megaselia xanthopus Beyer, 1965 c g
 Megaselia xanthopyge Beyer, 1965 c g
 Megaselia xanthozona (Strobl, 1892) c g
 Megaselia yatesi Disney, 2002 c g
 Megaselia zaitzevi Michailovskaya, 1991 c g
 Megaselia zariaensis Disney, 1989 c g
 Megaselia zebrina Beyer, 1964 i c g
 Megaselia zeno Borgmeier, 1962 c g
 Megaselia zeuzerae Disney, 1997 c g
 Megaselia zonata (Zetterstedt, 1838) c g

Data sources: i = ITIS, c = Catalogue of Life, g = GBIF, b = Bugguide.net

References

Megaselia